Nick Carter (born 28 April 1978) is a former Australian rules football player. During his career Carter played for Fitzroy, Brisbane and Melbourne in the Australian Football League (AFL).

Early life
Carter began playing football for Golden Square as a junior. He then played for the Bendigo Pioneers in the TAC Cup. Carter played for the Victorian Country team at the 1995 AFL Under 18 Championships.

AFL career

Fitzroy
Carter was drafted by Fitzroy Football Club with the 20th selection in the 1995 AFL draft, with coach Michael Nunan stating the club was looking for "players with pace and finish to play in the midfield". Carter had an impressive first AFL season, debuting in round 6 and remaining in the senior team for the rest of the season, playing 17 matches. He was nominated for the 1996 AFL Rising Star award in round 8. Despite a good season personally, Fitzroy struggled both on the field, winning only one match for the whole season, and financially. Due to crippling financial problems, Fitzroy was forced to merge with the Brisbane Bears at the end of the 1996 season, to form the Brisbane Lions.

Brisbane
Only eight Fitzroy players became Brisbane Lions players, with the majority of the team coming from the Brisbane Bears list. Carter, however, was one of those eight players. In his two seasons with Brisbane, Carter only managed to play five games, struggling to break into the senior side of a team with what Martin Blake described as "the best depth in the competition".

Melbourne
After struggling to gain a spot in the Brisbane senior team, Carter was traded to Melbourne at the end of the 1998 season for the 45th draft pick in the 1998 AFL draft. Carter only managed three games for the Demons and he was delisted at the end of the 1999 season. Carter nominated for the 1999 AFL draft, but he was not selected, thereby ending his AFL career.

Post-AFL career
After failing to be picked up in the 1999 Draft, Carter began playing with the Bendigo Diggers in the Victorian Football League (VFL). He played for Bendigo for eight seasons and was captain and assistant coach of the club during that time. In 2003 Carter was Bendigo's best and fairest player for the season, his third win of the award in four seasons. Carter also regularly represented the VFL when playing against other state leagues, such as the SANFL and the WAFL.

Carter is currently the coach of the Golden Square Football Club, the club he played junior football for.

Honours
Carter was named captain of the Bendigo Team of the Decade. Bendigo's best and fairest award is named the Carter Medal, in honour of his contributions to the club. He became the first Bendigo player to play 100 games for the club.

References

External links

Demon Wiki profile

1978 births
Living people
Bendigo Football Club players
Brisbane Lions players
Fitzroy Football Club players
Melbourne Football Club players
Bendigo Pioneers players
Golden Square Football Club players
Australian rules footballers from Bendigo